The 2006 Men's Asian Games Volleyball Tournament was the 13th edition of the event, organized by the Asian governing body, the AVC in conjunction with the OCA. It was held in Doha, Qatar from November 26 to December 14, 2006.

21 teams registered for the competition, Indonesia and Turkmenistan withdrew after the draw. Palestine also withdrew few days before the competition, but its results still counted.

Squads

Results
All times are Arabia Standard Time (UTC+03:00)

Qualification

Pool A

|}

Pool B

|}

Pool C

|}

Pool D

|}

Preliminary

Pool A

|}

Pool B

|}

Final round

Quarterfinals

|}

Pos 5–8

|}

Semifinals

|}

Pos 7–8

|}

Pos 5–6

|}

Bronze medal match

|}

Gold medal match

|}

Final standing

References

Results

External links
Official website

Men